The Battle of Jastków was a World War I battle that took place July 31–August 3, 1915, near the village of Jastków, then part of the Russian Empire. It was a major clash between the Russian Army and the Austro-Hungarian Polish Legions (primarily the 1st Brigade, Polish Legions). It was one of the Legion's largest engagements, and its first major one. The battle ended with the Austro-Hungarian and Polish victory, as the Russian forces retreated.

References
Jan Konefał. Bitwa Legionów Polskich pod Jastkowem w dniach 31 lipca – 3 sierpnia 1915 r.. „Rocznik Lubelski”. T. 27/28 (1985-1986), p. 121-129, 1988. Lublin: Wydawnictwo Lubelskie. ISSN 0080-3510

External links
Uczczono 100. rocznicę bitwy pod Jastkowem
Setna rocznica bitwy pod Jastkowem. Pamięć o boju ciągle żywa

Jastkow
Jastkow
Jastkow
Jastkow
Jastkow
Polish Legions in World War I
1915 in Poland
July 1915 events
August 1915 events